Miss Ghana is a national beauty pageant in Ghana. The current Miss Ghana 2020 is Monique Mawulawe Agbedekpui

Titleholders

Ghana debuted at Miss World 1959 with Star Nyaniba Annan. However, there have been two candidates (1990 and 1991) who represented Ghana at Miss World but were not Miss Ghana titleholders. There are also several years that Ghana did not send a representative to Miss World even though there was a titleholder.

See also
Miss Universe Ghana

References

Ghana
Beauty pageants in Ghana
Ghana
Ghanaian awards